Path.Finder (stylised as PATH.FINDER) is the fourth extended play by American electronic music producer Notaker. It was released by Canadian record label Monstercat on April 8, 2019. It contains six songs, including features of Singer-songwriter Karra and Eric Lumiere. The two singles "Into the Light" and "Each Other" were each released on January 31, 2019, and on March 18, 2019, respectively.

Background and release
The extended play released as a follow up to Notaker's previous extended play, Erebus I, released in 2018 on Canadian record label Mau5trap. It was marked as Notaker's second extended play release by Monstercat, since the release of his Genesis extended play in 2017. Path.Finder was released as the third in his Vessel series, which was released as a way to "showcase and discuss stories and themes not possible to convey in just one song".

To promote Path.Finder, two songs from the extended play were released as singles. Its lead single, "Into the Light", was released on January 31, 2019, and it's sophomore single "Each Other" on March 18. On April 8, 2019, the album was released exclusively as a digital download on international digital stores through Monstercat.

Critical reception
Path.Finder was well received by most critics. Farrell Sweeney of Dancing Astronaut noted the songs featured as having an "underlying dark edge that frames a collection of upbeat, vocal-lead, and ominous singles juxtaposed against one another." ThisSongSlaps Lauren Ikenn wrote that the extended play was "well worth the wait" and was "everything we wanted and more." Writing for The Nocturnal Times, Caroline O'Keefe compared it to Notaker's previous extended play, Erebus I, writing that the prior is more progressive-base, writing that the record took "listeners on a transcendent journey through progressive anthems, some of his most unique productions to date, and emotionally-rich narratives that culminate in a mesmerising balance of delight and remembrance." Asad Aftab of EDMTunes praised the extended play, stated that Notaker had assembled "emotionally powerful, synth-heavy bass music by crafting radiant soundscapes & coupling it with masterful production" and concluding his review by writing that it "It charts the evolution of Notaker as a musical artist as he explores a more melodic sound throughout, and it's exciting to see him evolve his sound even more on future releases."

The single "Each Other" had also garnered positive reception from critics, with Jim Babaoglu of EDM Sauce describing the single as an "uplifting progressive synthwave track that possesses both beauty and power", later stating that Notaker "never seems to disappoint." EDMTunes''' Ian Thompson called the single a "blast from Notaker's original synthwave style" and noted it as having a Seven Lions-esque beginning. Writing for Vents Magazine'', RJ Frometa stated that the song was a dance-primed "melodic midtempo track", writing that Notaker has continued to "take fans by surprise with the versatility in his production styles, continually testing new angles and giving his music a remarkability only a few artists are able to achieve."

Track listing

Release history

References

External links
 
 Lyrics of this EP at Genius

2019 EPs
Monstercat EPs
Electronic EPs
Synthwave albums
Electronic albums by American artists
Notaker EPs